The American Lacrosse Conference (ALC) was a women's lacrosse-only college athletic conference whose members competed at the Division I level of the National Collegiate Athletic Association (NCAA).  All of the ALC's members throughout its history were located in the eastern half of the United States. The conference was founded in 2001 in advance of the 2002 NCAA lacrosse season with seven members; nine schools were members at one time or another during its history.

In 2009–10, two more Southeastern Conference universities joined the ALC:  South Carolina and Florida.  The South Carolina program was eventually delayed with no timetable to begin play. In 2011 it was announced that the conference would add Michigan as the seventh member.  The Wolverines began NCAA competition in 2013–14, after transitioning the program from club to varsity status.

Starting with the 2015 season, Michigan, Ohio State, Penn State, and Northwestern joined Maryland and Rutgers in the new Big Ten women's lacrosse league, and Johns Hopkins' women's lacrosse team went independent.  In April 2014 it was announced that the two remaining programs, Florida and Vanderbilt, would be joining the Big East Conference as affiliate members in 2015, leaving the 2014 season as the last in American Lacrosse Conference history.

Final members 
In its final season, the ALC had seven members in the Eastern United States:

Former members 
Schools that left the ALC before 2014 include Davidson College in Davidson, North Carolina and Ohio University in Athens, Ohio.  Davidson later moved to the National Lacrosse Conference, still later became an associate member of the Big South Conference, and now houses its women's lacrosse team with most of its other sports in the Atlantic 10 Conference. Ohio University exited the ALC when the OU Athletics Department decided to drop several sports programs including women's lacrosse in January 2007.

Membership timeline 
Years listed in this timeline are lacrosse seasons. Since NCAA lacrosse for both men and women is a spring sport, the year of joining is the calendar year before the first season.

Championship history

References 

College lacrosse leagues in the United States
Defunct NCAA Division I conferences
Women's lacrosse competitions in the United States
Sports leagues established in 2001
Sports leagues disestablished in 2014
2001 establishments in the United States
2014 disestablishments in Pennsylvania